The PAC Rugby Conference is a college rugby conference composed of four schools from the Pac-12 Conference that compete against each other in Division 1-A Rugby. It was formed in 2012 with six teams, with conference play beginning in February 2013 to compete in Division 1-AA. In 2016, PAC added USC and Stanford and dropped Oregon State, and moved up to D1-A. Despite only recently moving up from D1-AA affiliation, the PAC has historically been one of the strongest conferences in college rugby, with five of its members consistently ranked in the Top 25 overall. The PAC Rugby Conference began play on February 2, 2013, with Cal beating Arizona State at Witter Field in Berkeley.

History of rugby at PAC schools
Around the turn of the century, American football was frowned upon for its violence, and President Theodore Roosevelt insisted upon reform or abolition of the game.  During this period of uncertainty, rugby made a brief but important reappearance in many colleges, most notably at Cal and Stanford.  It was these two Universities that supplied most of the players to the two U.S. Olympic rugby teams that won gold medals at the 1920 Olympics and 1924 Olympics. PAC Rugby was shown on television for the first time in 2014, when the PAC 12 Network broadcast Cal vs UCLA.  Cal has long been one of the faces of rugby at the collegiate level.  In addition, excellence by teams such as UCLA and Arizona, as well as  recent growth by USC, have made the conference one of the toughest in the country.

Members

Results

PAC Sevens Rugby Tournament

This PAC Sevens Rugby Tournament occurs every fall.  The winner of the tournament receives an automatic berth to the USA Rugby Sevens Collegiate National Championships.
The tournament debuted in 2011 where Colorado beat Utah in the final match. In 2012, all 12 of the Pac-12 schools participated for the first time and Cal won. In 2016 the tournament was hosted in Tucson, Arizona for the first time, where it was won by Cal for the fifth straight year .

References

External links
 

 
College sports in California
2012 establishments in the United States
Sports leagues established in 2012